Tbilisi City Assembly Building is a clock-towered edifice situated in the southern side of Freedom Square (in Georgian - tavisuplebis moedani), Tbilisi, capital of Georgia. It houses the City Assembly (sakrebulo).

History 
The original building was built under the Imperial Russian rule in the 1830s but was reconstructed several times, taking a different look over the past two centuries. It served, until 1879, as a Chancellery of Chief Policemaster and police department. A competition announced in 1878 for the remodeling the building to the City Hall (Gorodskoy Dom) was won by the architect Paul Stern's project. It exterior architecture reflects the then-popular Exotic style with Neo-Moorish design. A tower was added in 1910 and the building was further enlarged in 1912.

References 
 "საქართველოს ძველი ქალაქები: თბილისი" (2006), .

External links 

Government of Tbilisi

Tbilisi
Buildings and structures in Tbilisi